Dadalikavada is a village in Y. Ramavaram Mandal, East Godavari district in the state of Andhra Pradesh in India.

Demographics 
 India census, This Village had a population of 161, out of which 86 were male and 75 were female. Population of children below 6 years of age were 7%. The literacy rate of the village is 43%.

References 

Villages in Y. Ramavaram mandal